Willoughby East is a suburb on the lower North Shore of Sydney, in the state of New South Wales, Australia. Willoughby East is located 9 kilometres north of the Sydney central business district, in the local government area of the City of Willoughby.

Population
In the 2016 Census, there were 1,822 people in Willoughby East. 72.0% of people were born in Australia and 79.9% of people spoke only English at home. The most common responses for religion were No Religion 30.9%, Catholic 29.6% and Anglican 19.0%.

Transport
A bus depot is located in Stan Street.

References

Suburbs of Sydney
City of Willoughby